Alfredo Chaves is a municipality in the state of Espírito Santo, Brazil. It is 60 km southwest of the state capital, Vitória. Its population was 14,636 (2020) and its area is 615.79 km².

Geography

Located in the southeast of the state, it borders (east) Anchieta and Guarapari, (north) Marechal Floriano and Domingos Martins, (west) Vargem Alta, (south) Iconha and Rio Novo do Sul.

The municipality is mountainous, though not very high in general. Its highest peak is Trancenco Peak at 1,050 m above sea level. The town of Alfredo Chaves lies at 10 m above sea level.

Economy

The economy is mainly based on livestock, including cows (for milk) and chickens. In agriculture, coffee and banana plantations play an important role.

References

External links
Proinfo Alfredo Chaves

Municipalities in Espírito Santo